Beautiful Mess is the fourth full-length album by Thelonious Monster. It was their major label debut. Two versions of the album were released.

Track listing 
 I Live in a Nice House
 Blood Is Thicker Than Water
 Body and Soul?
 Adios Lounge
 I Get So Scared
 Song for a Politically Correct Girl From the Valley
 Ain't Never Been Nuthin' for Me in This World
 Bus With No Driver
 Vegas Weekend
 Weakness in Me (by Joan Armatrading)
 The Beginning and the End #12 N 35

European version
 I Live in a Nice House
 Blood Is Thicker Than Water
 Body and Soul?
 Adios Lounge
 I Get So Scared
 Song for a Politically Correct Girl From the Valley
 Ain't Never Been Nuthin' for Me in This World
 Bus With No Driver
 Vegas Weekend
 I Met an Angel
 A Little Bit Nervous
 You Want Me to Change
 Couple Of Kids

Personnel 
 Bob Forrest — vocals
 Dix Denney — guitar
 Chris Handsome — guitar
 Pete Weiss — drums
 Jon Sidel — guitar
 Martyn LeNoble - bass
 Zander Schloss - guitar

Additional musicians:
 Dan and Dave from Soul Asylum
 Benmont Tench III
 Michael Penn (backing vocals on "Body and Soul?")
 Al Kooper
 Sam Bush
 Tom Waits (duets on "Adios Lounge")

References

External links 
 Unappreciated Album of the Month
 Playboy - Feb 1993

1992 albums